Thomas W. Baumgarte (born 1966) is a German physicist specializing in the numerical simulation of compact objects in general relativity.

Career
Baumgarte completed his BSc in 1992 at Ludwig Maximilian University of Munich and his PhD in 1995 also at Ludwig Maximilian University of Munich. He is the author of over 65 articles about general relativity and astrophysics (for example, black holes, neutron stars, and gravitational collapse). In 2010, along with Stuart L. Shapiro, he published a book on numerical relativity. In 2012, he received the Bessel Prize.

Personal life 
Baumgarte is married to Karen Topp, who is also a professor at Bowdoin College.

References

External links
 
 Baumgarte Homepage at Bowdoin

1966 births
Living people
21st-century German physicists
Fellows of the American Physical Society